Poritia promula is a butterfly in the family Lycaenidae. It was described by William Chapman Hewitson in 1874. It is found in the Indomalayan realm.

Subspecies
Poritia promula promula (Java)
Poritia promula elegans Fruhstorfer, 1919 (Peninsular Malaysia)

References

External links
Poritia at Markku Savela's Lepidoptera and Some Other Life Forms

Poritia
Butterflies described in 1874
Butterflies of Asia
Taxa named by William Chapman Hewitson